Adewale Akinnuoye-Agbaje  (born 22 August 1967) is a Nigerian-British actor, director, and former fashion model known for his roles as Simon Adebisi in Oz, Mr. Eko in Lost, Lock-Nah in The Mummy Returns, Nykwana Wombosi in The Bourne Identity, Heavy Duty in G.I. Joe: The Rise of Cobra, Kurse in Thor: The Dark World, Killer Croc in Suicide Squad, Malko in the fifth season of the HBO series Game of Thrones, Dave Duerson in the NFL biopic drama Concussion, and Ogunwe in His Dark Materials.

Akinnuoye-Agbaje's feature directorial debut, Farming, wrapped production in 2017 and had its world premiere at the 2018 Toronto International Film Festival.

Early life and education
Akinnuoye-Agbaje was born in Islington, London, to Nigerian parents of Yoruba origin, who were students in the UK. When he was six weeks old, his biological parents gave him up to a white working-class family in Tilbury, Essex. His foster parents had at least ten African children, including Akinnuoye-Agbaje's two sisters, living in their house at certain points. His foster father made a living as a lorry driver and struggled to support the family financially.

When he was eight years old, his biological parents brought him back to Nigeria but, as he was unable to speak the Yoruba language and unable to assimilate, he was returned to Tilbury shortly thereafter. The brief exposure to Nigeria left him struggling to reconcile his heritage with the distinctly British culture and environment he was raised in. As a young boy, he was subject to continual racial abuse in the white neighbourhood he grew up. After enduring repeated physical attacks by local skinheads, he earned their respect by standing up to them and eventually aligned forces with them. At 16 years old, his birth parents sent him to a boarding school in Surrey where he ultimately attempted suicide before coming to terms with his background and turning his life around.

He went on to earn his Bachelor's from the University of London at large and subsequently a Master's in Law from King's College London. While a university student, Akinnuoye-Agbaje worked in a clothes shop where he was introduced to the world of modelling. On March 17, 2017, he was awarded an Honorary PhD by Princess Anne, Chancellor of the University of London.

Career 
Akinnuoye-Agbaje's modelling career led him to Hollywood, where he began his acting career with a 1995 role in Congo.

His best-known acting roles have been as the imposing convict Simon Adebisi in the 1990s HBO prison series Oz and as Mr. Eko on ABC's survivor drama Lost. Film roles include The Bourne Identity, in which he played a deposed African dictator, Hitu the police officer in Ace Ventura: When Nature Calls, Lock-Nah in The Mummy Returns, and Heavy Duty in G.I. Joe: The Rise of Cobra. He was also featured in the video for singer-songwriter Grayson Hugh's hit "Talk It Over", which was in heavy rotation in 1989 on MTV and VH-1.

In 2009, Akinnuoye-Agbaje was in talks with Marvel Studios to play the superhero Black Panther in a proposed film of the same name. In an interview, he stated his excitement about the possibility, saying that "the timing is so right" for a black superhero, and "while I'm in my prime, this is the time... I'm going to keep knocking on their door." In 2014 Marvel did announce a Black Panther film, though with Chadwick Boseman in the title role.

He guest starred in the second episode of season 8 of Monk, and played Derek Jameson in the 2011 film The Thing. He portrayed Kurse in the Marvel Studios film Thor: The Dark World. He portrayed the character Malko in the fifth season of Game of Thrones. In 2015 it was reported that Akinnuoye-Abaje voices the lead character of Bilal, a film about the life of Bilal Ibn Rabah set to be released in the second half of the year. In 2016, he co-starred in the DC Comics film Suicide Squad, as the Batman villain Killer Croc.

Directing career
In 2012, Akinnuoye-Agbaje stated that he had been developing a film about his life story, which he also planned to direct. The film is called Farming, in reference to the practise of Nigerian parents "farming out" their children to white UK families. In May 2017, he announced that casting on the film had begun with Damson Idris in the lead role as Enitan, Kate Beckinsale playing his abusive, neglectful foster mother and Gugu Mbatha-Raw as his teacher and mentor. The film went on to win the prestigious Michael Powell Award at the Edinburgh Film Festival for Best British Feature and Best Performance in a British Feature for Idris.

Personal life
Akinnuoye-Agbaje lives in Los Angeles. He is a Nichiren Buddhist and a member of the Soka Gakkai International Buddhist association.

Akinnuoye-Agbaje asked to be written off Lost, citing a desire to return to London after his foster parents' deaths and to direct a film there. He is a supporter of Arsenal F.C.

Filmography

Film

Television

Music videos
 "Talk It Over" – Grayson Hugh (1989)
 "Jealousy" – Pet Shop Boys (1991)
 "Giving Him Something He Can Feel" – En Vogue (1992)
 "Love No Limit" – Mary J. Blige (1993)
 "I Want It All Night Long" – Heather Hunter (1993)
 "You Don't Love Me (No, No, No)" – Dawn Penn (1994)

References

External links

 
 
 Adewale Akinnuoye-Agbaje interview on Tavis Smiley

1967 births
English expatriates in the United States
English people of Nigerian descent
English people of Yoruba descent
English Buddhists
British expatriate male actors in the United States
British male film actors
British male voice actors
English male television actors
Black British male actors
Black British fashion people
Members of Sōka Gakkai
Male actors from Essex
20th-century British male actors
21st-century British male actors
Converts to Sōka Gakkai
Alumni of University of London Worldwide
Alumni of King's College London
People from Islington (district)
People from Tilbury
Living people
Yoruba male actors
Alumni of the University of London